Womo and Sumararu are a Papuan language of Papua New Guinea. The two varieties are sufficiently divergent that Usher counts them as distinct languages.

Womo is spoken in Onei village of Bewani/Wutung Onei Rural LLG in Sandaun Province.

References

Languages of Sandaun Province
Serra Hills languages
Articles citing ISO change requests